The Lockhorns is a United States single-panel cartoon created September 9, 1968 by Bill Hoest and distributed by King Features Syndicate to 500 newspapers in 23 countries. It is continued today by Bunny Hoest and John Reiner.

Characters and story
The married couple Leroy and Loretta Lockhorn constantly argue. They demonstrate their mutual deep-seated hatred by making humorously sarcastic comments on each other's failings as spouses.

The strip initially was titled The Lockhorns of Levittown, and many of the businesses and institutions depicted in the strip are real places located in or near Huntington, New York, on the North Shore of Long Island. "When we use names, we get permission,"  Bunny Hoest said in 2019. “Dr. [Harold] Blog was our doctor for many years. He passed away. We still use him. He stays alive in the comic." Anticipating national syndication, Bunny Hoest suggested shortening the title to The Lockhorns. 

It began as a single-panel daily on September 9, 1968, with the Sunday feature launched April 9, 1972. The Sunday feature employs an unusual layout that ganged together several single-panel cartoons. Comics historian Don Markstein described the couple's battle of wits:

Bill Hoest died in 1988. His widow, Bunny Hoest, continued the strip with Bill Hoest's longtime assistant, John Reiner.

The Lockhorns

Leroy Lockhorn – The man of the house who drinks a lot, plays golf too much and chases everything good-looking in a skirt. Holds an undergraduate degree in philosophy.
Loretta Lockhorn – The woman of the house is a shopaholic, who drives and cooks terribly and does most of the handiwork around the house because either Leroy is too lazy to do it, or because he feels she should earn all the money she spends.
Loretta's mother – Never named and rarely seen (usually only during the Christmas season when she comes to stay), but hated mercilessly by Leroy.
D. Pullman, marriage counselor – Whom Leroy and Loretta routinely see but to no avail.
Arthur the bartender – Local saloonkeeper to whom Leroy often bemoans his circumstances.

Parodies
"Marital Mirth", part of the "Super-Fun-Pak Comics" in Tom the Dancing Bug, is a parody of The Lockhorns.
The Better Half comic strip is often seen as a tamer version of The Lockhorns.
An early Liō strip featured Liō's ants attacking numerous comic strips on a newspaper page, all of which parodied real comic strips. The Lockhorns appeared as The Hateeachothers, depicting a non-plussed Leeroy Hateeachother comparing the monstrous ant to Loretta's mother.
A Watch Your Head comic featured a movie trailer "Dear Loretta, Love, Leroy" where the bickering turns out to be a romantic comedy.

Books
At least nine Lockhorns collections were published by Signet between 1968 and 1982. Tor reissued the first in the series as The Lockhorns: "What Do You Mean You Weren't Listening? I Didn't Say Anything" in 1992.

Awards
Bill Hoest received the National Cartoonists Society's Newspaper Panel Cartoon Award for the strip for 1975 and 1980.

References

Sources
Strickler, Dave. Syndicated Comic Strips and Artists, 1924–1995: The Complete Index. Cambria, California: Comics Access, 1995.

External links
The Lockhorns official site

See also
Andy Capp

American comic strips
1968 comics debuts
Comic strips set in the United States
Comics about married people
Comics characters introduced in 1968
Gag cartoon comics
Gag-a-day comics
Fictional families